Yhency José Brazobán (born June 11, 1980) is a Dominican former professional baseball pitcher. He pitched in Major League Baseball for the Los Angeles Dodgers and Arizona Diamondbacks and in Nippon Professional Baseball for the Fukuoka SoftBank Hawks. He throws and bats right-handed.

Professional career

New York Yankees
Brazobán was signed as an undrafted free agent by the New York Yankees on July 10, 1997, and proceeded to hit .319 as an outfielder for the Yankees Dominican Summer League, earning a spot on the Dominican League All-Star Team.

In 1999–2000 he made the Gulf Coast League All-Star team, hitting .320 and .303, earning a promotion to Single-A Greensboro in 2000 and playing there through 2002.

The Yankees converted Brazobán from an outfielder to a pitcher in 2003, sending him to three different minor league levels to work on his pitching: the Gulf Coast Yankees, Tampa Yankees and Trenton Thunder. Combined he was 2–4 with 18 saves in 47 relief appearances.

Los Angeles Dodgers
He was acquired by the Los Angeles Dodgers from the Yankees on December 13, 2003, along with Jeff Weaver and Brandon Weeden in exchange for right-hander Kevin Brown. He earned a call-up to the Dodgers in 2004 after a sensational year at Class AA Jacksonville and Class AAA Las Vegas.

Brazobán made his Major League debut with the Los Angeles Dodgers on August 5, 2004, working one scoreless inning of relief against the Pittsburgh Pirates.

Primarily a setup man for Éric Gagné during the 2004 season, he became the Dodgers closer for a brief time in 2005 after Gagné was lost for the season with an injury. He established new Dodgers rookie records by appearing in 75 games and recording 21 saves.

Brazoban entered the 2006 season as a member of a strong Dodgers bullpen. He and Danys Báez, who was acquired for the 2006 season but was later traded, were slotted to work as setup men for closer Éric Gagné. However, early in the year Brazoban went on the disabled list with an elbow injury that cost him the entire season. He underwent Tommy John surgery to repair a torn ligament in his right elbow.

He worked his way back from the injury to rejoin the Dodgers' bullpen in May 2007, but after a few appearances he suffered another serious arm injury and was lost for the rest of the 2007 season. After two serious injuries in a row, he opened the 2008 season in the minors with the Jacksonville Suns. He pitched well enough in the minors to earn a return to the Dodgers bullpen, and the Dodgers called him up on May 9. He appeared in two games with the Dodgers in 2008, allowing two earned runs in three innings while striking out three batters and walking three, before the Dodgers again optioned him to Las Vegas. On July 19, the Dodgers placed him on the disabled list for the rest of the season with another shoulder injury. He was released after the season but eventually re-signed to a minor league contract with an invitation to spring training. However, he was released again on March 19, 2009.

Mexican League / New York Mets
Brazoban began the 2010 season in the Mexican League, where he was 4–3 with a 2.22 ERA in 52 relief appearances for Minatitlan and Mexico City. On August 15, 2010, he was signed to a minor league deal with the New York Mets, and was assigned to Triple-A Buffalo. He was in 10 games with Buffalo, with a 6.10 ERA.

Texas Rangers
On December 16, 2010, he was signed to a minor league contract with the Texas Rangers. He played in 16 games with the Round Rock Express and was released on June 2, 2011, with a 3.42 ERA.

Arizona Diamondbacks
Later that day, he signed a minor league contract with the Arizona Diamondbacks and was assigned to the Triple-A Reno Aces. After 8 games with the Aces, he had his contract purchased on June 28. He was outrighted to the minors on July 20.

Fukuoka SoftBank Hawks
Brazoban was sold to the Fukuoka SoftBank Hawks in Japan on July 29, 2011.

Vaqueros Laguna
On March 14, 2012, Brazoban signed with the Vaqueros Laguna of the Mexican Baseball League. He was released on June 22.

Rojos del Águila de Veracruz
On June 27, 2012, Brazoban signed with the Rojos del Águila de Veracruz of the Mexican Baseball League. He was released on June 29.

Grand Prairie AirHogs
Brazoban signed with the Grand Prairie AirHogs of the American Association of Independent Professional Baseball and played for them during the 2014 season.

References

External links

1980 births
Living people
Arizona Diamondbacks players
Bridgeport Bluefish players
Buffalo Bisons (minor league) players
Columbus Clippers players
Diablos Rojos del México players
Dominican Republic expatriate baseball players in Japan
Dominican Republic expatriate baseball players in Mexico
Dominican Republic expatriate baseball players in the United States
Dominican Summer League Dodgers players
Fukuoka SoftBank Hawks players
Grand Prairie AirHogs players
Greensboro Bats players
Gulf Coast Dodgers players
Gulf Coast Yankees players
Inland Empire 66ers of San Bernardino players
Jacksonville Suns players
Las Vegas 51s players
Los Angeles Dodgers players
Major League Baseball pitchers
Major League Baseball players from the Dominican Republic
Mexican League baseball pitchers
Nippon Professional Baseball pitchers
Petroleros de Minatitlán players
Reno Aces players
Rojos del Águila de Veracruz players
Round Rock Express players
Sportspeople from Santo Domingo
Tampa Yankees players
Tigres del Chinandega players
Tigres del Licey players
Trenton Thunder players
Vaqueros Laguna players
Dominican Republic expatriate baseball players in Nicaragua